Aftab Khan may refer to:

Aftab Ahmad Khan (1923–2011), Pakistani military leader
Aftab Ahmad Khan Sherpao (born 1944), Pakistani political leader
Aftab Ahmed Khan (born 1945), Indian Police Service officer
Aftab Gul Khan (born 1946), Pakistani cricketer

See also
Khan (surname)